The Roman Catholic Church in Kenya is composed of 4 Metropolitans and 20 suffragan dioceses.

List of dioceses

Episcopal Conference of Kenya

Metropolitan of Kisumu
Archdiocese of Kisumu
Diocese of Bungoma
Diocese of Eldoret
Diocese of Homa Bay
Diocese of Kakamega
Diocese of Kisii
Diocese of Kitale
Diocese of Lodwar

Metropolitan of Mombasa
Archdiocese of Mombasa
Diocese of Garissa
Diocese of Malindi

Metropolitan of Nairobi
Archdiocese of Nairobi
Diocese of Kericho
Diocese of Kitui
Diocese of Machakos
Diocese of Nakuru
Diocese of Ngong

Metropolitan of Nyeri
Archdiocese of Nyeri
Diocese of Embu
Diocese of Isiolo
Diocese of Maralal
Diocese of Marsabit
Diocese of Meru
Diocese of Muranga
Diocese of Nyahururu

External links 
Catholic-Hierarchy entry.
GCatholic.org.

Kenya
Catholic dioceses